Oakhurst may refer to:

Places
in Australia
 Oakhurst, New South Wales, a suburb in Sydney
 Oakhurst, Queensland, in the Fraser Coast Region

in South Africa
 Oakhurst Primary School

in the United States of America
 Oakhurst, California, in Madera County
 Oakhurst (Emelle, Alabama), a NRHP in Emelle, Alabama
 Oakhurst, Georgia
 Oakhurst, New Jersey
 Oakhurst (Greensboro, North Carolina), a NRHP-listed house
 Oakhurst, Michigan
 Oakhurst, Oklahoma
 Oakhurst, Texas

Other
Oakhurst (band), a bluegrass band from Denver, Colorado
Oakhurst Dairy